USCGC Champlain was a  of the United States Coast Guard, launched on 20 June 1928 and commissioned on 23 March 1929. After 12 years of service with the Coast Guard, she was transferred to the British Royal Navy as part of the Lend-Lease Act.

Career

US Coast Guard – Champlain
After commissioning in January 1929, Champlain was homeported in Stapleton, New York.

Royal Navy – Sennen
As part of the Lend-Lease Act she was transferred to the Royal Navy where she was renamed HMS Sennen (Y21) and commissioned on 12 May 1941. On 19 May 1943, Sennen assisted  in the sinking of U-954 by depth charges. At the end of the war, in March 1946, she was returned to the USCG.

US Coast Guard – Champlain (post war)
Upon her return to the USCG, her original name was restored and she was given the hull number and designation WPG-319. She was then placed into reserve status until March 1948 when she was sold to Hughes Brothers, Inc. of New York.

See also
 List of United States Coast Guard cutters

References

Lake-class cutters
Banff-class sloops
Ships of the United States Coast Guard
World War II sloops of the United Kingdom
1928 ships